Dr. Fritz Vollmar served as the Director General of the World Scout Foundation.

In 1988, Vollmar was awarded the 196th Bronze Wolf, the only distinction of the World Organization of the Scout Movement, awarded by the World Scout Committee for exceptional services to world Scouting. He was also a recipient of the Silver World Award.

References

External links

Recipients of the Bronze Wolf Award
Year of birth missing
Scouting and Guiding in Switzerland